Sericomyiini is a tribe of hoverflies consisting mainly of large bumblebee or wasp mimics. As with Eristalini the larvae have a telescopic breathing tube which allows them to breathe while submerged in boggy areas.

The tribe is sometimes classified under Eristalini as the subtribe Sericomyiina.

Taxonomy of genera and subgenera
 Arctophila subgenera of Sericomyia 
Conosyrphus  subgenus? of 2 species of Hoverfly, one (volucellinus) a unique endemic of the Caucasus region and the other characteristic of the Siberian arctic. 
Pararctophila Herve-Bazin, 1914 Asian 2 species Pararctophila external images
Pseudovolucella Shiraki, 1930  ten species. They are bee mimics found mostly in the mountains of south east Asia and Japan.10 species Pseudovolucella  external link
Pyritis Hunter, 1897 one species western North America North America Pyritis external images
Sericomyia Meigen, 1803 30 species  common in boreal forests across the Holarctic region and extend southward at higher elevations into the Oriental region and Neotropical regions.

Pseudovolucella Shiraki, 1930   All but one, an EastPalaearctic species, occur in the Oriental region.
Pseudovolucella decipiens external link to Pseudovolucella decipiens

References 

Eristalinae
Brachycera tribes